51 Aquilae (abbreviated 51 Aql) is a star in the equatorial constellation of Aquila. 51 Aquilae is its Flamsteed designation. It has an apparent visual magnitude of 5.39, which means it is faintly visible to the naked eye.

It is about 1.6 billion years old and is spinning relatively quickly with a projected rotational velocity of 77.5 km/s. The outer atmosphere has an effective temperature of 6,812 K, giving it the yellow-white hue characteristic of an F-type star.

References

External links
 Image 51 Aquilae
 HR 7553
 CCDM 19508-1046

Aquilae, 51
187532
Aquila (constellation)
F-type main-sequence stars
097650
7553
Durchmusterung objects